Temnozaga parilis is a species of sea snail, a marine gastropod mollusk in the family Sutilizonidae.

Description

Distribution

References

 Warén, A. & Bouchet, P. (2001) Gastropoda and Monoplacophora from hydrothermal vents and seeps; new taxa and records. The Veliger, 44, 116–231

External links

Sutilizonidae
Gastropods described in 1989